Enter Suicidal Angels is the second EP by the Swedish melodic death metal band Dark Tranquillity. It was recorded during the sessions for The Mind's I and it was also released as bonus tracks of the reissue of The Mind's I. Another reissue of the EP was released in October 2010 as a Gramophone record. In terms of the standard issue of this album, this is the only Dark Tranquillity release that Martin Henriksson does not have a writing credit. The song "Zodijackyl Light" was also included on The Mind's I.  The song "Archetype" is in the vein of industrial and techno.

Track listing

Credits

Dark Tranquillity
 Mikael Stanne − vocals; lyrics
 Niklas Sundin − lead guitar; music (1 & 2)
 Fredrik Johansson − rhythm guitar; music (1, 3 & 4)
 Martin Henriksson − bass guitar
 Anders Jivarp − drums; music (2)

Additional personnel on "Archetype"
Fredrik Nordström - music 
DJ L-Kman - remix

References

Dark Tranquillity albums
1996 EPs
Century Media Records EPs
Albums produced by Fredrik Nordström
Osmose Productions EPs